Kevin Owens and Sami Zayn are a Canadian professional wrestling tag team. Prior to signing with WWE, El Generico and Kevin Steen teamed in Ring of Honor (ROH) and across the independent circuit, nicknamed "Steenerico" by fans. Both men compete separately on the Raw and SmackDown brands.

History

Ring of Honor 
El Generico and Kevin Steen debuted in Ring of Honor as a team losing to The Briscoe Brothers on February 17, 2007. On April 14, Mark Briscoe returned in the middle of his brother Jay's and Erick Stevens match against Kevin Steen and El Generico; Mark was beaten up by the duo and was pinned by Steen. On May 11, Kevin Steen (as a heel) and El Generico (as a face) defeated Jason Blade and Eddie Edwards.

At Respect is Earned in a dark match, Kevin Steen and El Generico defeated The Irish Airborne (Jake Crist and Dave Crist), Pelle Primeau and Mitch Franklin and Jimmy Rave and Adam Pearce with Shane Hagadorn in a Tag Team Scramble match. That same night Kevin Steen and El Generico brawled with the Briscoe Brothers ending with Mark Briscoe suffering a mild concussion from a steel chair shot. At Driven, The Briscoe Brothers defeated Kevin Steen and El Generico to retain the ROH World Tag Team Championship. Steen and Generico then suffered losses to the Briscoes at Caged Rage in a Steel Cage match, Manhattan Mayhem II in a two out of three falls match and Man Up in a ladder match. Their only tag team win over the Briscoes was at Death Before Dishonor V Night 1 in a non title Boston Street Fight.

On June 6, 2008, Steen and Generico participated in the one night tournament to crown new ROH World Tag Team Champions. They defeated Go Shiozaki and ROH World Champion Nigel McGuiness in the first round and Chris Hero and Adam Pearce in the second round before losing to Jimmy Jacobs and Tyler Black in the finals. On September 19, 2008, Steen and Generico defeated Jacobs and Black to win the ROH World Tag Team Championship. They later lost the Championship to The American Wolves (Davey Richards and Eddie Edwards).

On December 19, 2009 at Final Battle 2009, ROH's first live pay-per-view, after a loss to The Young Bucks, Steen turned heel by attacking El Generico. Steen and Generico's feud ended a year later on December 18, 2010, at Final Battle 2010, where Generico defeated Steen in an unsanctioned Fight Without Honor, where he put his mask on the line against Steen's Ring of Honor career.

December 16, 2012 marked the final battle between Steen and Generico in Ring of Honor. At Final Battle 2012, the 4th Ladder War match took place at the Hammerstein Ballroom in New York City. What ended up being Generico's final match in Ring of Honor, Generico came up short against Steen after Steen hit the Package Piledriver on a ladder contraption built throughout the match by both competitors.

Pro Wrestling Guerrilla 

On July 29, 2007 at Giant Size Annual #4, Generico and Steen defeated PAC and Roderick Strong to become the PWG World Tag Team Champions for the first time. They successfully defended the belts for almost three months, losing them to the team of Davey Richards and Super Dragon on October 27 in England as part of PWG's European Vacation II tour. The next night, Steen teamed with PAC in an attempt to regain the belts from Dragon and Richards, announcing pre-match that if he lost, he'd leave the company indefinitely. He was unable to win the bout.

Generico and Steen won the title for a second time, this time from The Dynasty (Joey Ryan and Scott Lost) on March 21, 2008, after Steen returned to PWG for an impromptu match. They became the first team in PWG history to be a part of the annual Dynamite Duumvirate Tag Team Title Tournament to defend the belts in each match they had. In the tournament finals, they lost to Jack Evans and Roderick Strong, thus ending their second reign. After El Generico had agreed to a deal with WWE, he and Steen reunited one more time on January 12, 2013, by entering the 2013 Dynamite Duumvirate Tag Team Title Tournament. After wins over The Briscoe Brothers and Future Shock (Adam Cole and Kyle O'Reilly), they were defeated in the finals of the tournament by The Young Bucks.

WWE

First Feud and reunion (2014–2019) 
Generico signed to WWE on January 9, 2013, where he worked in their developmental territory NXT as Sami Zayn, while Steen remained signed to ROH. On August 12, 2014, Steen signed with WWE and was also sent to NXT under the ring name Kevin Owens and debuted at NXT TakeOver: R Evolution in the opening match, defeating CJ Parker. In the main event, Zayn defeated Adrian Neville to win the NXT Championship. After a long celebration with the roster, Owens turned on Zayn, delivering a powerbomb on the apron and re-igniting their feud. On February 11, 2015 at NXT TakeOver: Rival, Owens won the title from Zayn via ref stoppage after continuously powerbombing Zayn.

In May 2015, Owens was brought up to the main roster, followed by Zayn the following year. On the May 16, 2016 episode of Raw, Owens and Zayn were placed in a tag team match to face Cesaro and The Miz in a winning effort, but Owens attacked Zayn immediately after the match. The two went on to have a grudge match at the Battleground pay-per-view, where Zayn defeated Owens. Both were drafted to the Raw brand during the 2016 WWE draft, but were traded to the SmackDown brand during the 2017 WWE Superstar Shake-up.

On October 8, 2017, at Hell in a Cell, Zayn helped Owens defeat SmackDown Commissioner Shane McMahon in the main event, turning Zayn heel for the first time in his career and reuniting with Owens in the process. On the October 10 episode of SmackDown Live, Zayn said that Owens was right all along and called Owens his "brother". On the October 17 episode of SmackDown Live, Owens and Zayn defeated Randy Orton and Shinsuke Nakamura in a tag team match after Zayn hit a low blow on Orton. On the Survivor Series kickoff show, Owens and Zayn defeated Breezango (Tyler Breeze and Fandango). Later that night, they attacked Shane McMahon during the 5-on-5 Survivor Series Interbrand elimination match, which ultimately led to Team SmackDown's defeat. On the November 28 episode of SmackDown Live, Owens defeated Orton in a no disqualification match after interference from Zayn, who was originally banned from ringside. On the December 5 episode of SmackDown Live, Zayn lost to Orton with Owens handcuffed to the ring ropes.

At Clash of Champions on December 17, Owens and Zayn faced Orton and Nakamura in a tag team match with their jobs on the line and both Shane McMahon and SmackDown General Manager Daniel Bryan as referees. After a fast count from Bryan, Owens and Zayn won the match, thus keeping their jobs. Following Clash of Champions, Owens and Zayn embarked on a feud with WWE Champion AJ Styles, facing him at Royal Rumble in a Handicap Match and at Fastlane in a six-pack challenge, also including Baron Corbin, Dolph Ziggler, and John Cena, failing both times. During the Fastlane match, Owens and Zayn's rivalry with Shane McMahon intensified when Shane, who was sitting at ringside, constantly interfered and broke up pinfalls attempted by both Owens and Zayn. This led to a match at WrestleMania 34 against the team of Shane McMahon and the SmackDown General Manager Daniel Bryan, who made his in-ring return after years of retirement. At WrestleMania, Zayn submitted to Bryan's Yes! Lock. After they lost, they joined Raw, where they wrestled several tag team matches until Money in the Bank. After the event, it was reported that Zayn had to undergo surgery to fix torn rotator cuffs on his knee and shoulder, thus splitting the team and Owens was reported to undergo knee surgery as well.

On the June 4, 2019 episode of SmackDown Live, Owens and Zayn reunited to face The New Day in a losing effort. At Stomping Grounds, they defeated The New Day. After Stomping Grounds event, the duo of Owens and Zayn drifted apart again, after Owens turned face and reignited his feud with Shane McMahon. Sami Zayn then went on to continue his work as a menacing, ruthless heel which helped him to win the Intercontinental Championship on two separate occasions in 2020.

Second feud (2021–2023) 
In March 2021, Zayn began a gimmick as a deranged conspiracy theorist that believed the WWE was holding him down. Soon after, Zayn reignited his feud with Owens after Zayn tried unsuccessfully to convince Owens to believe in his conspiracy theories. Owens then challenged Zayn to a match at WrestleMania 37, which Zayn accepted. At WrestleMania, Owens defeated Zayn. After Zayn interfered with Owens & Big E’s tag team match against Apollo Crews and Commander Azeez on the June 18, 2021, edition of SmackDown, Owens demanded a match against Zayn at  Hell in a Cell, which Zayn won. On the July 2 episode of SmackDown, Owens defeated Zayn in a rematch, which was contested as a Last Man Standing match. This was also a qualifying match for the men's Money in the Bank ladder match ending their second feud.

After joining The Bloodline in 2022 as the "Honorary Uce", Zayn began a feud with Owens by the start of 2023 and wrestled each other on the January 20 episode of SmackDown only for The Usos and Solo Sikoa to interfere. During the Royal Rumble main event, Roman Reigns, who questioned Zayn's loyalty in recent weeks, retained the Undisputed WWE Universal Championship against Owens and proceeded to have the rest of The Bloodline attack Owens after the match. Zayn refused to join the beatdown and eventually hit Reigns with a steel chair, prompting the rest of The Bloodline to beat down Zayn and thus ejecting him from the group while Jey Uso walked out. On the February 3 episode of SmackDown, Zayn attacked Reigns and challenged him to a match for the Undisputed WWE Universal Championship at Elimination Chamber, which Reigns accepted. Zayn failed to win the title and was assaulted by Reigns and Jimmy Uso following the match until Owens appeared and saved Zayn. On the following episode of Raw after Elimination Chamber, Zayn offered an olive branch to Owens and proposed that they team up to bring down The Bloodline together, but Owens rejected it.

Reunion for the battle against The Bloodline (2023-) 
On the March 17, 2023, episode of SmackDown, Cody Rhodes invited Owens and Zayn to hash it out so that they can reunite to fight against The Bloodline, but Owens again declined to team up with Zayn. Later that night, Zayn confronted Jey Uso in the ring and was beaten up by The Usos. Owens ran out to save Zayn and embraced him.

Championships and accomplishments 
 Pro Wrestling Guerrilla
 PWG World Tag Team Championship (2 times)
 Ring of Honor
 ROH World Tag Team Championship (1 time)
 Wrestling Observer Newsletter
 Feud of the Year (2010)

References

External links 
 Kevin Owens' Online World of Wrestling profile
 Sami Zayn's Online World of Wrestling profile

Independent promotions teams and stables
Ring of Honor teams and stables
WWE teams and stables